Kraskovsky is a surname. Notable people with the surname include:

 Ippolit Kraskovsky (1845–1899), Russian writer
 Ivan Kraskovsky (1880–1955), Ukrainian-Belarusian politician
 Pavel Kraskovsky (born 1996), Russian ice hockey player

See also
 Krasovsky (disambiguation)